Atlético Benidorm CD is a Spanish association football club, based in Benidorm, Alicante. It currently plays in the in Valencian Divisiones Regionales de Fútbol.

History 
Atlético Benidorm CD is a Spanish football club based in Benidorm, province of Alicante, Valencian Community. The club was founded in 1987 and currently plays in the Primera Regional División, the Seventh tier of Spanish football.

Atlético Benidorm CD has a long history in the numerous divisions of Spanish football, with its best achievement being promotion to Segunda División B, the third tier of Spanish football, in the 1999-2000 season. The club has also had success in the Copa del Rey, reaching the round of 32 on two occasions.

With a strong local and international following, Atlético Benidorm CD has had a number of successful seasons, including a number of promotions and appearances in the final stages of various cup competitions. Atlético Benidorm CD home matches are played at the Estadio Municipal Guillermo Amor, which has a capacity of over 8,000 spectators. 

Atlético Benidorm CD is known for its youth academy, which has produced several players who have gone on to have successful careers at higher levels of professional football. The academy is an important part of the club’s mission to promote the development of young football talent in the region and to provide opportunities worldwide.

References

External links
La Preferente profile
Atlético Benidorm Club Deportivo Official website
website
Soccerway profile

Benidorm
Football clubs in Spain
Association football clubs established in 2020
2020 establishments in Spain